Nambucca Valley Council is a local government area in the Mid North Coast region of New South Wales, Australia.

Within the Shire's boundaries is Bowraville, one of the most socially disadvantaged areas in Australia.

The mayor of the Nambucca Valley Council is Rhonda Hoban, an independent politician.

The local government area was created on 15 December 1915, from land excised from Bellingen Shire, and was originally called Nambucca Shire. The area was renamed Nambucca Valley from 4 December 2019.

Towns and localities 

Towns and localities in the Nambucca Valley Council area:

Heritage listings
The Nambucca Valley has a number of heritage-listed sites, including:
 Macksville, North Coast railway: Macksville railway station

Demographics

Aboriginal and Torres Strait Islander people made up 7.6 per cent of the population, nearly treble the national and state averages of 2.8 and 2.9 per cent respectively. The median age of people in the Nambucca Valley Council was 51 years; some thirteen years higher than the national median. Children aged 0 – 14 years made up 16.6 per cent of the population and people aged 65 years and over made up 27.6 per cent of the population. Of people in the area aged 15 years and over, 44.9 per cent were married and 17 per cent were either divorced or separated.

The median weekly income for residents within the Nambucca Valley Council was significantly below the national average, being one of the factors that place parts of the Nambucca Valley Council in an area of social disadvantage.

significantly higher proportion (90.1 per cent) where English only was spoken at home (national average was 72.7 per cent). Of the 90 Australian residents who stated that they speak Gumbaynggir, an Australian Aboriginal language, 28 live within the Nambucca Valley Council.

Council

Current composition and election method
Nambucca Valley Council is composed of nine councillors, including the mayor, for a fixed four-year term of office. The mayor is directly elected while the eight other councillors are elected proportionally as one entire ward. The most recent election was held on 10 September 2016, and the makeup of the council is as follows:

The current Council, elected in 2016, in order of election, is:

See also

Local government in New South Wales

References

Local government areas of New South Wales
1915 establishments in Australia
Mid North Coast